The Rhaetian sandstone or Rhatsandstein is a geological formation in Germany. It dates back to the "Rhaetian - ?early Hettangian."

Vertebrate fauna

See also
 List of dinosaur-bearing rock formations

References

Triassic System of Europe
Geology of Germany